Aluniș is a commune in Mureș County, Transylvania, Romania. It is composed of three villages: Aluniș, Fițcău (Fickópataka) and Lunca Mureșului (Holtmaros).

Natives
 Ödön Tömösváry

See also
List of Hungarian exonyms (Mureș County)

References

Communes in Mureș County
Localities in Transylvania
Székely communities